José Greci (10 January 1941 – 1 June 2017) was an Italian film, television and stage actress.

Life and career
Born in Ferrara as Giuseppina Greci, the daughter of the journalist and television writer Luigi. In 1956 at just fifteen years old Greci enrolled at the Silvio D'Amico National Academy of Dramatic Art; after two years she left the Academy to debut on stage. 

Greci made her film debut in 1959, playing the Virgin Mary in William Wyler's Ben-Hur. From then she started appearing in dozens of genre films, soon becoming one of the most prolific actresses in 1960s Italian cinema, particularly becoming a star in the sword-and-sandal and eurospy genres. Also active on television, she gradually abandoned her career during the seventies. She died in Rome, Italy on 1 June 2017, aged 76.

Selected filmography 

 La cento chilometri (1959) - The Cello Player Friend of Elena
 Ben-Hur (1959) - Mary (uncredited)
 Revenge of the Barbarians (1960) - Sabina
 Romolo e Remo (1961) - Estia
 Le italiane e l'amore (1961) - (segment "Un matrimonio")
 Il sangue e la sfida (1962)
 Colossus of the Arena (1962) - Revia
 The Rebel Gladiators (1962) - Arminia
 War Gods of Babylon (1962) - Crisia
 Zorro and the Three Musketeers (1963) - Isabella
 Goliath and the Sins of Babylon (1963) - Regia / Chelima
 The Bread Peddler (1963) - Amanda
 Hercules and the Masked Rider (1963) - Dona Blanca - Francisco's Daughter
 Hercules Against the Mongols (1963) - Bianca de Tudela
 The Ten Gladiators (1963) - Livia
 Death on the Fourposter (1964) - Kitty
 Hercules Against the Barbarians (1964)  - Arminia / Armina
 'Sword of the Empire (1964) - Nissia, blonde slave
 Revenge of The Gladiators (1964) - Priscilla
 Espionage in Tangier (1965) - Lee Randall
 Seven Rebel Gladiators (1965) - Assuer
 Operation Poker (1965) - Helga
 Last Man to Kill (1966) - Ellen
 Special Code: Assignment Lost Formula (1966) - Lynn
 Maigret a Pigalle (1966) - Arlette
 Bury Them Deep (1968) - Sign. Gennaroni
 All on the Red (1968) - Yvette
 All'ultimo sangue (1968) - Consuelo
 The Most Beautiful Couple in the World (1968)
 The Sicilian Connection (1972) - Lucia
 Catene (1974) - (final film role)

References

External links 
 

1941 births
2017 deaths
Italian film actresses
Italian television actresses
Italian stage actresses
Actors from Ferrara
Accademia Nazionale di Arte Drammatica Silvio D'Amico alumni